New Labour, New Life for Britain was a political manifesto published in 1996 by the British Labour Party. The party had recently rebranded itself as New Labour under Tony Blair. The manifesto set out the party's new "Third Way" centrist approach to policy, with subsequent success at the 1997 general election.

The 1997 general election produced the biggest Labour majority, in seat terms, in the history of the party's existence. They won 418 seats, with a majority of 179. They delivered on the main aims of the manifesto including introducing a minimum wage, increasing National Health Service (NHS) spending and reducing class sizes in schools.

The Conservatives' rule was over after eighteen years; under the leadership of John Major they suffered their worst defeat since the 1906 general election, losing 178 seats, including the unseating of seven Conservative Cabinet Ministers and the loss of all their Scottish and Welsh representation; becoming the official opposition with 165 seats. This election was the start of a Labour government following an 18-year spell in opposition and continued with another landslide victory in 2001 and a third consecutive victory in 2005, despite losing a great deal of popular support. In 2010, they became the official opposition with 258 seats, having fallen to 29% in the popular vote.

The new Leader of the Labour Party, Ed Miliband, completely abandoned the New Labour branding in 2010 after being elected, moving the party's political stance slightly to the left.

Pledge card
During the 1997 general election campaign, a pledge card with five specific pledges was issued and detailed in the manifesto too. The pledges were:
 Cut class sizes to 30 or under for 5, 6 and 7-year-olds by using money from the assisted places scheme.
 Fast-track punishment for persistent young offenders by halving the time from arrest to sentencing.
 Cut NHS waiting lists by treating an extra 100,000 patients as a first step by releasing £100,000,000 saved from NHS red tape.
 Get 250,000 under-25s off benefits and into work by using money from a windfall levy on the privatised utilities.
 No rise in income tax rates, cut VAT on heating to 5% and inflation and interest rates as low as possible.

See also
 List of Labour Party (UK) general election manifestos
 Our Society, Your Life
 Individual Learning Accounts
 Freedom of Information Act 2000
 Human Rights Act 1998
 National Minimum Wage Act 1998
 Regional development agencies
 Devolution
 UK Trident programme (retaining)
 Windfall Tax (United Kingdom)
 Total ban on the use of landmines

References

New Labour
Political history of the United Kingdom
Political manifestos
1996 in politics
1996 in the United Kingdom
Party platforms
1996 documents